Malinair was a commuter airline based at Glasgow Airport (GLA) in Scotland in the mid-1980s.

Code data 
 IATA Code: WG
 ICAO Code: MAK
 Callsign: Malin

History 
The company was founded in June 1985 by Glasgow lawyer Frank Cannon. Scheduled operations were launched in early 1986 with a Glasgow to Donegal service using 9 passenger Britten Norman Islander aircraft. A planned expansion saw the recruitment of a number of ex Air Ecosse staff, including Malinair's General Manager and Operations Manager.

In the summer of 1986, Malinair began operating the former Air Ecosse Aberdeen-Glasgow-Belfast service with a leased Dornier 228 from Schreiner Airways (PH-SDO, re-registered G-MLDO cn8009) using Ecosse's route licence and WG flight code. By the following year the company had 3 BN2 Islanders (G-MALI, G-MALN, G-MALB) and 2 further Do.228s (G-MLNR cn8108 & G-CFIN cn8096) operating a mix of daytime schedule/charter and night mail flights.

1987 heralded an expansion of service from Donegal with the launch of flights to Manchester using a Do.228, whilst another Dornier operated Glasgow-Teesside-Gatwick. For a short time a BN2 Islander operated a Glasgow to Humberside service.

Night mail flights were operated from Belfast, Glasgow and Aberdeen, primarily for Datapost. Despite ambitious plans including a £15 million contract for 7 Dorniers, the company ceased operations in the autumn of 1987.

The end of Mailinair was complex with the shareholders agreeing in June 1987 to sell the company to Air Ecosse. Air Ecosse had itself been in administration since January 1987 and had only recently been bought by Isle of Man-based Traditional Investments for £477,000. Air Ecosse was in turn sold the following year to another Aberdeen based airline, Peregrine Air Services.

Fleet 
 3 – BN2 Islander
 3 – Dornier 228

See also
 List of defunct airlines of the United Kingdom

References
 Flight International. Sutton, UK: Reed Business Information. ISSN 0015-3710

Defunct airlines of Scotland
Defunct airlines of the United Kingdom